Francisco Santos may refer to:
 Francisco Dos Santos (born 1974), Brazilian footballer
 Francisco Santos (swimmer, born 1962), Angolan/Portuguese swimmer, artist and writer, also known as Xesko
 Francisco Santos (swimmer, born 1998), Portuguese_swimmer
 Francisco Santos (baseball) (born 1974), former Major League Baseball outfielder
 Francisco Santos (footballer) (born 1904), Portuguese footballer
 Francisco Santos Calderón (born 1961), Colombian politician and journalist
 Francisco Santos Leal (born 1968), Spanish mathematician
 Francisco Cabrera Santos (1946–2010), mayor of Valencia, Carabobo, Venezuela
 Francisco Santos, Piauí, a municipality in the state of Piauí, Brazil

Santos, Francisco